Faouzi Rzig (born 9 July 1982) is a Paralympian athlete from Tunisia competing mainly in category F35 javelin events.

Fauzi finished fourth in the F35 javelin in the 2004 Summer Paralympics in Athens, but four years later in Beijing he left with the gold medal from the combined F33/34/52 class javelin.

References

External links
 

1982 births
Living people
Tunisian male javelin throwers
Paralympic athletes of Tunisia
Paralympic gold medalists for Tunisia
Athletes (track and field) at the 2004 Summer Paralympics
Athletes (track and field) at the 2008 Summer Paralympics
Athletes (track and field) at the 2016 Summer Paralympics
Medalists at the 2008 Summer Paralympics
Paralympic medalists in athletics (track and field)
20th-century Tunisian people
21st-century Tunisian people